Andrew Bujalski (born April 29, 1977)   is an American film director, screenwriter and actor, who has been called the "godfather of mumblecore."

Life and career 
Bujalski, born in Boston in 1977, is the son of artist-turned-businesswoman Sheila Dubman and businessman Edmund Bujalski. His father is Catholic and his mother is Jewish. Bujalski studied film at Harvard's Department of Visual and Environmental Studies, where the Belgian filmmaker Chantal Akerman was his thesis advisor.

He shot his first feature, Funny Ha Ha, in 2002 and followed it with Mutual Appreciation in 2003. They received theatrical distribution in 2005 and 2006, respectively. Bujalski wrote both screenplays and appears as an actor, playing a major role in both films. In 2006 he appeared as an actor and contributed to the screenplay of the Joe Swanberg film Hannah Takes the Stairs.

Beeswax and Computer Chess, Bujalski's third and fourth films, were filmed in Austin, where the director lives. Beeswax was released in summer 2009. While making it Bujalski wrote a screenplay adaptation of Benjamin Kunkel's 2005 novel Indecision for Paramount Pictures.

His fourth feature, Computer Chess, is a period film set at a computer programming tournament in 1980. It premiered at the 2013 Sundance Film Festival and won the Alfred Sloan Feature Film Prize. It is his first feature edited digitally and the only feature film shot almost exclusively with original Sony 1968 AVC-3260 B&W video cameras.

Bujalski married Karen Olsson in 2009. They have two children.

Bujalski also has worked as a writer on several studio projects, including, most recently, the live-action remake of Disney’s Lady and the Tramp.

Style and content 

Bujalski's rough-edged, realistic films are often compared to the works of directors John Cassavetes, Maurice Pialat and Mike Leigh. All of his feature films were photographed by Austrian cinematographer Matthias Grunsky. The first three are shot on hand-held 16mm, have a sometimes decidedly "lo-fi" feel (reinforced by Funny Ha Ha'''s distorted mono sound), and are often classified as mumblecore. The actors are non-professionals, many drawn from other media, including animator Kate Dollenmayer as the lead in Funny Ha Ha, musician Justin Rice as the lead in Mutual Appreciation and experimental filmmaker Bill Morrison in a supporting role in the same film. Funny Ha Ha featured a cast and crew of Harvard alumni.

Though his films often appear improvised, they are for the most part scripted; the dialogue is often noted for its drawn-out, awkward nature, and characters frequently evade key topics. Many of the films seem to start and end in medias res, giving the films a "slice of life" feeling that suggests a larger narrative or world that the audience is looking in on.

The characters in Bujalski's films are mostly middle-class. The desire for stability is a recurring theme, and many characters rush headlong into attempts at a more controlled existence; one of the main characters in Funny Ha Ha elopes with his ex-girlfriend.

 Filmography 

As director, writer, and editor

As actor

 Awards 
 Alfred Sloan Feature Film Prize, 2013 – Sundance Film Festival
 Best Director, 2005 – Sidewalk Moving Picture Festival
 Best Screenplay, 2005 – Newport International Film Festival
 Someone to Watch Award, 2004 – IFP

 References 

 External links 
 
 Funny Ha Ha Official Site
 Mutual Appreciation Official Site
 Beeswax Official Site
 Computer Chess Official Site
 "Young Intellectuals Making Movies", essay on Andrew Bujalski and Noah Baumbach in Dissent, Summer 2006.
 Video Interview Berlinale 2009 Cargo Film Magazine
 Don't Say "Mumblecore" to Bujalski, article and video, Sept 17, 2009
 Andrew Bujalski performs and is interviewed on Radio Happy Hour
 A conversation with Andrew Bujalski on The Marketplace of Ideas''
 In Conversation: Straight Talk: Andrew Bujalski, In Conversation with Paul Felten, The Brooklyn Rail

Living people
1977 births
American male writers
American male screenwriters
Film directors from Massachusetts
Film directors from Texas
Harvard University alumni
Male actors from Austin, Texas
Writers from Boston
Writers from Austin, Texas
Alfred P. Sloan Prize winners